Kalinovka is a rural locality (a village) in Bizhbulyaksky Selsoviet, Bizhbulyaksky District, Bashkortostan, Russia. The population was 109 as of 2010. There are 4 streets.

Geography 
Kalinovka is located 7 km northwest of Bizhbulyak (the district's administrative centre) by road. Bizhbulyak is the nearest rural locality.

References 

Rural localities in Bizhbulyaksky District